Exp may stand for:

 Exponential function, in mathematics
 Expiry date of organic compounds like food or medicines
 Experience points, in role-playing games
 EXPTIME, a complexity class in computing
 Ford EXP, a car manufactured in the 1980s
 Exp (band), an Italian group in the 1990s
 "EXP" (song), a song by The Jimi Hendrix Experience from the album Axis: Bold as Love
 EXP (calculator key), to enter numbers in scientific or engineering notation

See also
 Exponential map (disambiguation)